Census divisions, in Canada and the United States, are areas delineated for the purposes of statistical analysis and presentation; they have no government in and of themselves. The census divisions of Canada are second-level census geographic unit, below provinces and territories, and above "census subdivisions" and "dissemination areas". In provinces where they exist, the census division may correspond to a county, a regional municipality or a regional district. 

In the United States, the Census Bureau divides the country into four census regions and nine census divisions. The bureau also divides counties (or county equivalents) into either census county divisions or minor civil division, depending on the state. The American state of Alaska does not include counties, instead being divided into 19 boroughs and 10 census divisions.

See also

 Census geographic units of Canada
 Statistics Canada
 United States Census Bureau census regions and divisions

References

Types of administrative division

United States Census Bureau geography